Frost is a surname. Notable people with the surname include:
 Alex Frost (born 1987), American actor
 Andrew Frost (disambiguation), several people
 Anthony Frost (born 1951), English abstract artist
 Arthur Burdett Frost (1851–1928), American illustrator and graphic artist
 Dame Barbara Frost (born 1952), British charity executive
 Bede Frost (1875–1961), English priest
 Charles Frost (disambiguation), several people
 Craig Frost (born 1948), American musician
 Dan Frost (born 1961), Danish track cyclist
 Daniel M. Frost (1823–1900), Confederate general during the American Civil War
 Darrel Frost (born 1951), American herpetologist
 David Frost (disambiguation), several people
 Derrick Frost (born 1980), American footballer
 Doug Frost (swimming coach) (born 1943), Australian swimming coach
 Doug Frost (wine), American Master of Wine, Master Sommelier and author
 Edwin Brant Frost (1855–1935), American astronomer
 Emma Frost, British screenwriter and producer
 Eunice Frost (1914–1998), British publisher
 Francis Theodore Frost (1843–1916), Canadian manufacturer and politician
 Frank Frost (disambiguation), several people
 Gavin Frost (born 1930), British occult author and Wiccan
 Harry Frost (1914–1973), Canadian ice hockey player 
 Harry Frost (rugby union) (1869–1954), New Zealand rugby player
 Heinrich Adolph Frost (1844–1909), German businessman 
 Henry Atherton Frost (1883–1952), American architect
 Hildreth Frost (1880–1955), Colorado lawyer and soldier
 Honor Frost (1917–2010), British pioneer of underwater archaeology
 Jack Frost (disambiguation), several people
 James Frost (disambiguation), several people 
 Jenny Frost (born 1978), British singer and model
 Joanne (Jo) Frost (born 1970), English television personality, nanny, and author
 John Frost (disambiguation), several people
 Joseph H. Frost (1805–1866), American missionary
 Kenneth Frost (1934–2013), American astrophysicist
 Kid Frost (born 1964), Mexican-American hip-hop artist
 Lane Frost (1963–1989), American bull rider
 Lauren Frost (born 1985), American actress
 Laurence Hugh Frost (1902–1977), American Admiral
 Lee Frost (director) (born 1935), American film director
 Lee Frost (footballer) (born 1957), English footballer
 Leslie Frost (1895–1973), Canadian politician
 Lindsay Frost (born 1962), American actress
 Mark Frost (disambiguation), several people
 Martin Frost (born 1942), American politician
 Mervyn Frost (born 1947), British political scientist
 Michael Frost (disambiguation), several people
 Morgan Frost (born 1999), Canadian ice hockey player
 Morten Frost (born 1948), Danish badminton player
 Nick Frost (born 1972), English actor and comedian
 Olive Grey Frost, one of several wives of Joseph Smith, Jr.
 Peter Frost, British writer, photographer, and archaeologist
 Polly Frost, American journalist
 Robert Frost (disambiguation), several people
 Royal Harwood Frost (1879–1950), American astronomer
 Sadie Frost (born 1965), English actress and fashion designer
 Scott Frost (born 1965), American football coach
 Scott Frost (writer), American screenwriter and novelist
 Sherry Frost, American politician
 Stef Frost (born 1989), English professional footballer
 Stephen Frost (born 1955), English comedian
 Stephen James Frost (born 1972), Texan politician
 Stuart W. Frost (1891–1990), American entomologist
 Terry Frost (1915–2003), English abstract artist
 Terry Frost (actor) (1906–1993), American actor
 Thomas Frost (disambiguation), several people
 Tony Frost (born 1975), English cricketer
 Tyler Frost (born 1999), English footballer
 Wade Hampton Frost (1880–1938), American epidemiologist
 Warren Frost (born 1925), American actor
 William Frost (disambiguation), several people
 Wilson Frost (1925–2018), American lawyer and politician
 Wenlan Hu Frost (born 1958), Chinese-American artist

See also 
 Forst
 Jack Frost, Nordic folk personification of the cold

English-language surnames